Bibi Kaulan (Punjabi: ਕੌਲਾਂ) is believed to be a spiritual woman who lived during time of Guru Hargobind Sahib, the 6th Sikh Guru. Kaulan means the one who is Living in abode of Lotus. There is dispute among historians regarding bibi Kaulan and her relation to Guru Hargobind. Some scholars believed her to have been the wife of Guru Hargobind, where others believe that she was his servant. Scholars commonly hold the viewpoint that she was a true disciple of Guru Hargobind and spent her life under directions of the Guru. Mata Kaulan was a true disciple of Guru Hargobind Sahib and lived all her life meditating and singing Guru Nanak's bani.

See also 

 Women in Sikhism

References

Mysticism
Esotericism
Year of birth unknown
Year of death unknown

 ਰਵੀ ਢਾਬਾਂ